Callao is a seaside city, port and region in the Lima metropolitan area of Peru.

Callao may also refer to:

Places

 Avenida Callao ('Callao Avenue'), Buenos Aires, Argentina
Callao (Line B Buenos Aires Underground)
Callao (Line D Buenos Aires Underground)
 Callao District, Callao Region, Peru
 Roman Catholic Diocese of Callao, Peru
 Callao Cave, Peñablanca, Cagayan province, Philippines
 Callao Square, Madrid, Spain
 Callao (Madrid Metro)
 Callao, Missouri, United States
 Callao Township, Macon County, Missouri, United States
 Callao, Utah, United States
 Callao, Virginia, United States
 El Callao Municipality, Bolivar State, Venezuela
 El Callao, Venezuela

Ships
 , 1888–1898 
 , the name of several American ships

Other uses
 "Callao" (song), by Anna Carina, 2019
 Callao, a song by Wisin & Yandel from the 2018 album Los Campeones del Pueblo
 Pilsen Callao, a beer by Backus and Johnston Brewery
 National University of Callao, in Callao province, Peru

See also

 Callao affair, 1820
 Battle of Callao (1838)
 Battle of Callao, 1866 
 Blockades of Callao, several events
 Siege of Callao (disambiguation), several events